Life by You is an upcoming life simulation game developed by Paradox Tectonic and published by Paradox Interactive, with development led by former Executive Vice President of EA Play and Head of The Sims Label Rod Humble.

The game was teased on March 6, 2023, and the first full trailer was published on March 20, 2023. Life by You has been announced to come out in early access on September 12th, 2023 on Steam and Epic Games Launcher.

Gameplay 

Numerous features were showcased in the trailer released on March 20, most notably an open-world with no loading screens, a color wheel designed to allow for further customization, the ability to set a specific age for a character and different life stages available for selection, interpersonal information displayed when hovering over other characters, interactive locations for shopping and following a character to their workplace, and many others that made an appearance during the trailer.

The game also features dialog that is able to be customized by the player using real-life languages, as well as the ability to control any character in the world at any time.

References 

Upcoming video games
Life simulation games
Paradox Interactive games